Miss You may refer to:

Music

Albums
 Miss You, by the Stranglers or the title song (see below), 2003
 Miss You (EP), by Gabrielle Aplin, 2016

Songs
 "Miss You" (1929 song), a song written in 1929, recorded by Bill Haley
 "Miss You" (Aaliyah song), 2002
 "Miss You" (Feeder song), 2008
 "Miss You" (Gabrielle Aplin song), 2016
 "Miss You" (Jérémie Makiese song), 2022
 "Miss You" (Louis Tomlinson song), 2017
 "Miss You" (M-flo song), 2003
 "Miss You" (Martin Tungevaag, Sick Individuals and Marf song), 2020
 "Miss You" (Robin Schulz and Oliver Tree song), 2022
 "Miss You" (Rolling Stones song), 1978
 "Miss You" (Westlife song), 1999, covered as "I Miss You" by Basshunter (2008)
 "Miss You" (Yuna Ito song), 2008
 "Miss You", by Alabama Shakes from Sound & Color
 "Miss You", by Candlebox from Into the Sun
 "Miss You", by Cashmere Cat
 "Miss You", by Clinic from Free Reign
 "Miss You", by the Crows
 "Miss You", by Dream from It Was All a Dream
 "Miss You", by Enrique Iglesias from Insomniac
 "Miss You", by Foster the People from Torches
 "Miss You", by Kashmir from The Good Life
 "Miss You", by MYMP from Soulful Acoustic
 "Miss You", by Manfred Mann from Soft Vengeance
 "Miss You", by Mariah Carey from The Remixes
 "Miss You", by Mirwais Ahmadzaï
 "Miss You", by Nickelback from No Fixed Address
 "Miss You", by the Stranglers from Written in Red
 "Miss You", by Trentemøller from The Last Resort
 "Miss U", by Charli XCX from 13 Reasons Why: Season 3 (A Netflix Original Series Soundtrack)
 "Miss U", by Faze from Faze Alone
 "Miss U", by the Notorious B.I.G. from Life After Death

See also 
 I Miss You (disambiguation)
 Missing You (disambiguation)
 "Miss You Much", a song by Janet Jackson